Serhiy Viktorovych Kovalenko (born 10 May 1984) is a Ukrainian retired footballer who played as a midfielder or forward.

Career

Early career
Serhiy Kovalenko started his youth career at Yunist Chernihiv. Then he moved to Russia to play for the youth squads of Dynamo Moscow and Sportakademklub Moscow.

Juventus
Kovalenko moved to Juventus youth team in 2001. He was offered a contract after a trial along with Ilyos Zeytulayev and Viktor Budyanskiy. In February 2002, he joined Juve permanently. The Turin club paid US$400,000 (about €454,000) to buy Kovalenko and Zeytulayev's image and registration rights from Sportakademklub Moscow.

Loan to Lodigiani
In January 2004, he was loaned to Lodigiani.

Standard Liège
He joined Standard Liège in August 2004. Juve received €5,000 for the player.

Loan to Lokeren
He then joined Lokeren in January 2007.

Roeselare
In August 2007 he signed a 2-year contract with Roeselare. In March 2008 he terminated his contract with Roeselare.

Volyn Lutsk
Kovalenko returned to Ukraine to play for Volyn Lutsk on 12 August 2008.

Torpedo Zhodino
In March 2009, he was signed by Torpedo Zhodino of Belarus.

Honours
Naftan Novopolotsk
 Belarusian Cup: 2012

References

External links
 
 Sergey Kovalenko - career, fotos, all goals, statistic
 
 
 

1984 births
Living people
Footballers from Chernihiv
FC Yunist Chernihiv players
Ukrainian footballers
Association football midfielders
Ukrainian expatriate footballers
Expatriate footballers in Russia
Expatriate footballers in Italy
Expatriate footballers in Belgium
Expatriate footballers in Belarus
Ukrainian expatriate sportspeople in Russia
Ukrainian expatriate sportspeople in Italy
Ukrainian expatriate sportspeople in Belgium
Ukrainian expatriate sportspeople in Belarus
Belgian Pro League players
Ukrainian First League players
Belarusian Premier League players
Juventus F.C. players
A.S. Lodigiani players
Standard Liège players
K.S.C. Lokeren Oost-Vlaanderen players
K.S.V. Roeselare players
FC Volyn Lutsk players
FC Torpedo-BelAZ Zhodino players
FC Belshina Bobruisk players
FC Naftan Novopolotsk players
PFC Sumy players
FC Poltava players
FC Yednist Plysky players